The Great Plains Art Museum is a fine arts museum located in Lincoln, Nebraska that is dedicated to the arts of the Great Plains  in the United States.

The museum, which opened in 1981 at the University of Nebraska-Lincoln,  was founded with the Christlieb Collection (sculptures, paintings, drawings, photographs and library), donated by John and Elizabeth Christlieb of Bellevue, Nebraska.

The Christlieb Collection includes works by Albert Bierstadt, William de la Montagne Cary,  Robert Fletcher Gilder,  William Henry Jackson, Frederic Remington, Charles M. Russell and Olaf Wieghorst.

Subsequent acquisitions and donations  have expanded the museum's collections with works by Lyman Byxbe,  Ray Ellis, John Philip Falter, Michael Forsberg,  Veryl Goodnight,  Chuck Guildner,  Cliff Hollestelle,  Laurie Houseman-Whitehawk,  Keith Jacobshagen,  Ted Long,  Herb Mignery,  Andrew Peters,  Del Pettigrew,  Martha Pettigrew,  Jackson Pollock, Norman Rockwell, Grant Wood and others.

The Great Plains Art Museum is part of the Center for Great Plains Studies  at the University of Nebraska-Lincoln.  Exhibits are typically rotated several times per year and include artwork from the permanent collection, guest-curated exhibitions, and traveling exhibits.

The center and the museum are located at Hewit Place, 1155 Q Street, in Lincoln, Nebraska. The museum is free and open to the public.

References

External links
 Great Plains Art Museum
 Artwork by William de la Montagne Cary

American West museums
University of Nebraska–Lincoln
Museums in Lincoln, Nebraska
University museums in Nebraska
Art museums and galleries in Nebraska
Art museums established in 1981
1981 establishments in Nebraska